Reserve requirements are central bank regulations that set the minimum amount that a commercial bank must hold in liquid assets. This minimum amount, commonly referred to as the commercial bank's reserve, is generally determined by the central bank on the basis of a specified proportion of deposit liabilities of the bank. This  rate is commonly referred to as the reserve ratio. Though the definitions vary, the commercial bank's reserves normally consist of cash held by the bank and stored physically in the bank vault (vault cash), plus the amount of the bank's balance in that bank's account with the central bank. A bank is at liberty to hold in reserve sums above this minimum requirement, commonly referred to as excess reserves.

The reserve ratio is sometimes used by a country’s monetary authority as a tool in monetary policy, to influence the country's money supply by limiting or expanding the amount of lending by the banks. Monetary authorities increase the reserve requirement only after careful consideration because an abrupt change may cause liquidity problems for banks with low excess reserves; they generally prefer to use open market operations (buying and selling government-issued bonds) to implement their monetary policy. In the United States and many other countries (except Brazil, China, India, Russia), reserve requirements are generally not altered frequently in implementing a country's monetary policy because of the short-term disruptive effect on financial markets.

Policy objective
One of the critical functions of a country's central bank is to maintain public confidence in the banking system, because under the fractional-reserve banking system in operation in most countries worldwide banks are not expected to hold cash to cover all deposits liabilities in full. One of the mechanisms used by most central banks to further this objective is to set a reserve requirement to ensure that banks have, in normal circumstances, sufficient cash on hand in the event that large deposits are withdrawn, which may precipitate a bank run. The central bank in some jurisdictions, such as the European Union, does not require reserves to be held during the day, while in others, such as the United States, the central bank does not set a reserve requirement at all.

Bank deposits are usually of a relatively short-term duration, and may be “at call”, while loans made by banks tend to be longer-term, resulting in a risk that customers may at any time collectively wish to withdraw cash out of their accounts in excess of the bank reserves. The reserves only provide liquidity to cover withdrawals within the normal pattern. Banks and the central bank expect that in normal circumstances only a proportion of deposits will be withdrawn at the same time, and that the reserves will be sufficient to meet the demand for cash. However, banks routinely find themselves in a shortfall situation or may experience an unexpected bank run, when depositors wish to withdraw more funds than the reserves held by the bank. In that event, the bank experiencing the liquidity shortfall may routinely borrow short-term funds in the interbank lending market from banks with a surplus. In exceptional situations, the central bank may provide funds to cover the short-term shortfall as lender of last resort. When the bank liquidity problem exceeds the central bank’s lender of last resort resources, as happened during the global financial crisis of 2007-2008, the government may try to restore confidence in the banking system, for example, by providing government guarantees.

Effects on money supply

Textbook view
Many textbooks describe a system in which reserve requirements can act as a tool of a country’s monetary policy though these bear little resemblance to reality and many central banks impose no such requirements. The commonly assumed requirement is 10% though almost no central bank and no major central bank imposes such a ratio requirement.

With higher reserve requirements, there would be less funds available to banks for lending. Under this view, the money multiplier compounds the effect of bank lending on the money supply. The multiplier effect on the money supply is governed by the following formulas:

 : definitional relationship between monetary base MB (bank reserves plus currency held by the non-bank public) and the narrowly defined money supply,

 : derived formula for the money multiplier m, the factor by which lending and re-lending leads  to be a multiple of the monetary base:

where notationally,

 the currency ratio: the ratio of the public's holdings of currency (undeposited cash) to the public's holdings of demand deposits; and

 the total reserve ratio (the ratio of legally required plus non-required reserve holdings of banks to demand deposit liabilities of banks).

This limit on the money supply does not apply in the real world.

Endogenous money view
Central banks dispute the money multiplier theory of the reserve requirement and instead consider money as endogenous. See endogenous money.

Jaromir Benes and Michael Kumhof of the IMF Research Department report that the "deposit multiplier" of the undergraduate economics textbook, where monetary aggregates are created at the initiative of the central bank, through an initial injection of high-powered money into the banking system that gets multiplied through bank lending, turns the actual operation of the monetary transmission mechanism on its head. Benes and Kumhof assert that in most cases where banks ask for replenishment of depleted reserves, the central bank obliges. Under this view, reserves therefore impose no constraints, as the deposit multiplier is simply, in the words of Kydland and Prescott (1990), a myth. Under this theory, private banks almost fully control the money creation process.

Required reserves

United States
The Board of Governors of the Federal Reserve System sets reserve requirements (“liquidity ratio”) based on categories of deposit liabilities ("Net Transaction Accounts" or "NTAs") of depository institutions, such as commercial banks including U.S. branches of a foreign bank, savings and loan association, savings bank, and credit union. The deposit liability categories currently subject to reserve requirements are mainly checking accounts, with no reserve requirement on savings accounts and time deposit accounts of individuals. The total amount of all NTAs held by customers with U.S. depository institutions, plus the U.S. paper currency and coin currency held by the nonbank public, is called M1.

As of March 2020, the reserve requirement for all deposit institutions was set to 0% of eligible deposits. The removal of reserve requirements followed the Federal Reserve's shift to an "ample-reserves" system, in which the Federal Reserve Banks pay member banks interest on excess reserves held by them.

Under the International Banking Act of 1978, the same reserve ratios apply to branches of foreign banks operating in the United States.

China

The People's Bank of China uses changes in the reserve requirement as an inflation-fighting tool, and raised the reserve requirement ten times in 2007 and eleven times since the beginning of 2010.

Countries and districts without reserve requirements
Canada, the UK, New Zealand, Australia, Sweden and Hong Kong have no reserve requirements.

This does not mean that banks can—even in theory—create money without limit. On the contrary, banks are constrained by capital requirements, which are arguably more important than reserve requirements even in countries that have reserve requirements.

A commercial bank's overnight reserves are not permitted to become negative. The central bank will step in to lend a bank funds if necessary so that this does not happen. Historically, a central bank might have run out of reserves to lend to banks with liquidity problems and so had to suspend redemptions, but this can no longer happen to modern central banks because of the end of the gold standard worldwide, which means that all nations use a fiat currency.

A zero reserve requirement cannot be explained by a theory that holds that monetary policy works by varying the quantity of money using the reserve requirement.

Even in the United States, which retained formal reserve requirements until 2020, the notion of controlling the money supply by targeting the quantity of base money fell out of favor many years ago, and now the pragmatic explanation of monetary policy refers to targeting the interest rate to control the broad money supply. (See also Regulation D (FRB).)

United Kingdom
In the United Kingdom, commercial banks are called clearing banks with direct access to the clearing system.

The Bank of England, the central bank for the United Kingdom, previously set a voluntary reserve ratio, and not a minimum reserve requirement. In theory, this meant that commercial banks could retain zero reserves. The average cash reserve ratio across the entire United Kingdom banking system, though, was higher during that period, at about 0.15% .

From 1971 to 1980, the commercial banks all agreed to a reserve ratio of 1.5%. In 1981 this requirement was abolished.

From 1981 to 2009, each commercial bank set out its own monthly voluntary reserve target in a contract with the Bank of England. Both shortfalls and excesses of reserves relative to the commercial bank's own target over an averaging period of one day would result in a charge, incentivising the commercial bank to stay near its target, a system known as reserves averaging.

Upon the parallel introduction of quantitative easing and interest on excess reserves in 2009, banks were no longer required to set out a target, and so were no longer penalised for holding excess reserves; indeed, they were proportionally compensated for holding all their reserves at the Bank Rate (the Bank of England now uses the same interest rate for its bank rate, its deposit rate and its interest rate target). In the absence of an agreed target, the concept of excess reserves does not really apply to the Bank of England any longer, so it is technically incorrect to call its new policy "interest on excess reserves".

Canada
Canada abolished its reserve requirement in 1992.

Australia 
Australia abolished "statutory reserve deposits" in 1988, which were replaced with 1% non-callable deposits.

United States 
The United States removed reserve requirements for nonpersonal time deposits and eurocurrency liabilities on Dec 27, 1990 and for net transaction accounts on March 27, 2020.

Reserve requirements by country
The reserve ratios set in each country and district vary. The following list is non-exhaustive:

See also

 Bank regulation
 Basel accords
 Capital requirement
 Capital adequacy ratio
 Criticism of the Federal Reserve 
 Excess reserves
 Financial repression
 Fractional-reserve banking
 Full-reserve banking
 Great Contraction
 Islamic banking
 Monetary policy of central banks
 Money creation
 Money supply
 Negative interest on excess reserves
 Statutory liquidity ratio
 Tier 1 capital
 Tier 2 capital

References

External links
 Title 12 of the Code of Federal Regulations (12CFR) Part 204--Reserve Requirements of Depository Institutions (Regulation D)  (See Section §204.4 for current reserve requirements.)
Reserve Requirements - Fedpoints -  Federal Reserve Bank of New York (May 2007)
Reserve Requirements - The Federal Reserve Board
Hussman Funds - Why the Federal Reserve is Irrelevant - August 2001
Don't mention the reserve ratio

Banking
Monetary policy
Financial ratios
Financial economics
Capital requirement